This article lists the botanical gardens found in the state of Tamil Nadu, India.

List of botanical gardens

See also
 List of botanical gardens in India
 List of botanical gardens
 Ministry of Environment and Forests (India)

References

External links

 Botanic Garden Conservation International's garden search database

 
Botanical gardens
Tamil Nadu